Ülküspor is a Turkish football club from Izmir. The team was founded 1914 as Ülküspor.

Ülküspor was founded as the third club after Altay and Karşıyaka in Izmir in 1914. They played in second and third leagues for many years. Currently, Ülküspor plays in amateur leagues of Izmir since 1987.

Stadium
Currently the team plays at local field in front of İzmir Atatürk Stadium.

League participations
 TFF Second League: 1956–1972
 TFF Third League: 1972–1987
 Turkish Regional Amateur League : 1987–

References

External links
Official Web Site

See also
1963–64 Turkish Second Football League

Football clubs in Turkey
Association football clubs established in 1914